Edwin Lins (9 March 1963 – 17 January 2018) was an Austrian wrestler who competed in the 1984 Summer Olympics and in the 1988 Summer Olympics.

References

External links
 

1963 births
2018 deaths
Olympic wrestlers of Austria
Wrestlers at the 1984 Summer Olympics
Wrestlers at the 1988 Summer Olympics
Austrian male sport wrestlers